The canton of Le Haut-Minervois is an administrative division of the Aude department, southern France. It was created at the French canton reorganisation which came into effect in March 2015. Its seat is in Rieux-Minervois.

It consists of the following communes:
 
Aigues-Vives
Azille
Bagnoles
Cabrespine
Castans
Caunes-Minervois
Citou
Laure-Minervois
Lespinassière
Limousis
Pépieux
Peyriac-Minervois
Puichéric
La Redorte
Rieux-Minervois
Rustiques
Saint-Frichoux
Sallèles-Cabardès
Trassanel
Trausse
Villarzel-Cabardès
Villegly
Villeneuve-Minervois

References

Cantons of Aude